Lakeline Mall is a super-regional shopping mall located in north Austin, Texas, at the intersection of RR 620 and US 183. Although the mall has a Cedar Park postal code, it is physically within the City of Austin. It has  of gross leasable area. Construction was initially slated to begin in the 1980s but was stalled due to the savings and loan crisis and later stalled due to the discovery of two endangered species on the proposed site. Lakeline Mall opened on October 11, 1995. The anchor stores are Macy's, JCPenney, AMC Theatres, and two Dillard's stores. A sixth anchor, Sears, closed in 2018.

Anchor Tenants
Dillard's (Women & Home Furniture)
Dillard's (Men & Kids)
JCPenney
Macy's (former Foley's)

Former Anchor Tenants
Foley's (converted to Macy's in September 2006)
Mervyns (closed as of February 2006)
Sears (closed as of September 2018)

References

Shopping malls in Austin, Texas
Simon Property Group
Shopping malls established in 1995